The 1966–67 Luxembourg National Division was the 53rd season of top level association football in Luxembourg. The competition was contested by 12 teams with Jeunesse Esch winning the championship.

League standings

Results

References
Luxembourg - List of final tables (RSSSF)

Luxembourg National Division seasons
Lux
Nat